Lowzdar-e Vosta (also Romanized as Lowzdar-e Vosţá and Lowzdar-e Vasaţī; also known as Lowzdar-e Vasaţ and Lūz-e Vosţá) is a village in Hendudur Rural District, Sarband District, Shazand County, Markazi Province, Iran. At the 2006 census, its population was 69, in 21 families.

References 

Populated places in Shazand County